Berardo is a given name and a surname. Notable people with this name include:

 Saint Berardo of Teramo (died 1123), Italian saint
 Saint Berardo dei Marsi (1079–1130), Italian saint
 Berardo di Castagna (died 1252), Italian Roman Catholic archbishop
 Berardo Eroli (1409–1479), Italian Roman Catholic bishop and cardinal
 Joe Berardo (born 1944), Portuguese businessman
 Rubina Berardo (born 1982), Portuguese politician